NA-229 Dadu-II is a constituency for the National Assembly of Pakistan.

Members of Parliament

2018-2022: NA-235 Dadu-II

Election 2002 

General elections were held on 10 Oct 2002. Rafiq Ahmed Jamali of PPP won by 56,814 votes.

Election 2008 

General elections were held on 18 Feb 2008. Rafiq Ahmed Jamali of PPP won by 87,467 votes.

Election 2013 

General elections were held on 11 May 2013. Rafiq Ahmed Jamali of PPP won by 76,876 votes and became the member of National Assembly.

Election 2018 

General elections were held on 25 July 2018.

See also
NA-228 Dadu-I
NA-230 Karachi Malir-I

References

External links 
Election result's official website

NA-232